The 1880–81 season is the seventh season of competitive football by Rangers.

Overview
Rangers played a total matches during the 1880–81 season.

Results
All results are written with Rangers' score first.

Scottish Cup

Appearances

See also
 1880–81 in Scottish football
 1880–81 Scottish Cup

External links
1880–81 Rangers F.C.Results

Rangers F.C. seasons
Rangers